Sha Tin, also spelt Shatin, is a neighbourhood along Shing Mun River in the eastern New Territories, Hong Kong. Administratively, it is part of the Sha Tin District. Sha Tin is one of the neighbourhoods of the Sha Tin New Town project.

The new town was founded in 1973 under the New Towns Development Programme of the Hong Kong government. Its current name was named after the nearby village of Sha Tin Wai.  The literal English translation is 'Sand Fields'.

History
Tai Wai Village, located in Tai Wai, next to Sha Tin, and the oldest and largest walled village in Sha Tin District, was built in 1574, during the Ming Dynasty.

Before British rule in Hong Kong, the area of Sha Tin and its vicinity was referred to as Lek Yuen (lit. "source of trickling" or "source of clear water"). Colonial officials allegedly mistook the name of the Sha Tin Wai village as the name of the area and it has been used ever since. Nowadays, the original name is used to refer to Lek Yuen Estate.

There was a market township: Sha Tin Hui, at the present location of Sha Tin Centre Street and New Town Plaza shopping centre, near the Sha Tin station of the MTR East Rail line.

Sha Tin was the location of the first flight of a powered aircraft in Hong Kong in 1911. The aeroplane was named as the Spirit of Sha Tin. A full size replica of this plane now hangs in Hong Kong International Airport.

The area was formerly agricultural farmland. Before Sha Tin's development into a new town, Hung Mui Kuk, southwest of Sha Tin, was perennially the main site for school picnics. The hillside area remains a popular barbecue site.

Starting in the 1970s, the area became part of the Sha Tin New Town development. Since then, the economy in the area has greatly improved and living standards have also increased. Sha Tin Town Centre was developed during the mid-1980s to help "link the town's currently dispersed residents into one cohesive community." The 18-hectare site, adjacent to the railway station, was built up in stages to house an array of uses including the New Town Plaza, numerous smaller shopping malls, Sha Tin Park, a magistracy, library, town hall, marriage registry, hotel, town square, and several residential towers.

Geography

Sha Tin is located in a valley, on both sides of the Shing Mun River, running from the southwest to the northeast. It is bordered by Tai Wai in the southwest and by Fo Tan (left bank) and Shek Mun (right bank) in the northeast.

Cross-border activities 
Due to their proximity to the Shenzhen border, towns in the northern parts of Hong Kong, notably Sheung Shui and Yuen Long, have become hubs for parallel traders who have been buying up large quantities of goods, forcing up local prices and disrupting the daily lives of local citizens. Since 2012, there has been an increase in mainland parallel traders arriving in the North District of Hong Kong to re-export infant formula and household products – goods popular with mainlanders – across the border to Shenzhen. The volume of smuggling activity spilled over into Tuen Mun and Sha Tin in 2014.

The first anti-parallel trading protest was started at Sheung Shui in September 2012. As government efforts to limit the adverse impact of mainland trafficking were widely seen as inadequate, so there have been further subsequent protests in towns in the New Territories including Sha Tin.

Housing

Public housing estates

Private housing estates

Private housing estates in Sha Tin include:
City One
Lucky Plaza
Sha Tin Centre
Wai Wah Centre
Sha Tin Plaza
Garden Rivera
Fung Shing Court
 Belair Gardens
 Castello, Hong Kong

Villages
South bank of Shing Mun River. From west to east:
 Sha Tin Tau
 Tsang Tai Uk
 Tsok Pok Hang
 Fui Yiu Ha New Village
 Sha Tin Wai
 Wong Uk
 To Shek
 Chap Wai Kon
 Ngau Pei Sha
North bank of Shing Mun River. From west to east:
 Lai Chi Yuen
 Tin Liu, part of Pai Tau
 Pai Tau
 Pai Tau Hang
 Sheung Wo Che
 Ha Wo Che

Shopping centres

New Town Plaza
Citylink Plaza
Sha Tin Plaza
Sha Tin Centre
Lucky Plaza
Hilton Plaza
Wai Wah Centre
Fortune City One
Grand Central Plaza - HomeSquare

Notable places of worship

 Sai Lam Temple
 Sam Yuen Temple
 Wai Chuen Monastery
 Dao Hop Yuen
 Ten Thousand Buddhas Monastery
 Tao Fung Shan Christian Centre
 International Fellowship North, English speaking Christian church in Siu Lek Yuen.
Shatin Baptist Church
 Shatin Anglican Church

Health

The Prince of Wales Hospital was officially opened in 1982. It provides about 1,400 hospital beds and 24 hours Accident & Emergency service to the eastern New Territories. Other institutions which provide hospital services include the Sha Tin Hospital, the Cheshire Home and the Union Hospital.

Other facilities

 Sha Tin Town Hall
Sha Tin Public Library
Hong Kong Heritage Museum
Sha Tin Marriage Registry
Sha Tin Park
Royal Park Hotel
Sha Tin Sports Ground
Star Seafood Floating Restaurant

Education

At present, there are 46 primary and 44 secondary schools in Sha Tin and Ma On Shan. Tertiary institutions include Hong Kong Baptist University (Shek Mun Campus), the Chinese University of Hong Kong, the Hang Seng University of Hong Kong, the Hong Kong Institute of Vocational Education - Sha Tin (IVE-ST) and the Hong Kong Sports Institute.

Hong Kong Baptist University (Shek Mun Campus)
The Chinese University of Hong Kong
St. Rose of Lima's College
Baptist Lui Ming Choi Secondary School
Buddhist Wong Wan Tin College
Lutheran Theological Seminary
Ng Yuk Secondary School
Sha Tin College
Sha Tin Junior School
Sha Tin Government Secondary School
Sha Tin Methodist College
Shatin Tsung Tsin Secondary School
Stewards Pooi Kei College
Sheng Kung Hui Tsang Shiu Tim Secondary School
Jockey Club Ti-I College
Pui Ying College
Christ College
Carmel Alison Lam Primary School
Lok Sin Tong Young ko hsiao Lin Secondary School
Hong Kong and Kowloon CCPA Ma Chung Sum Secondary School
Kiangsu-Chekiang College (Shatin)
Pentecostal Lam Hon Kwong School
Lam Tai Fai College
Hong Kong Baptist University Affiliated School Wong Kam Fai Secondary And Primary School

Shatin Town Centre is in Primary One Admission (POA) School Net 91. Within the school net are multiple aided schools (operated independently but funded with government money); no government schools are in this net.

Culture, sports and recreational facilities
There are numerous cultural, recreational and sport facilities in Sha Tin including the Town Hall, swimming pools, football pitches, indoor recreation centres and various track and field facilities for the use of Sha Tin residents.

The 8-hectare Sha Tin Park was opened to public in 1988. Apart from its horticultural gardens and impressive water features, it also includes a large open plaza and a bandstand. The Ma On Shan Park, which is adjacent to Ma On Shan Swimming Pool, occupies 5.5 hectare of land.

The Sha Tin Racecourse, occupying approximately 70 hectares, rests on reclaimed flatland. At the centre of the racecourse is the Penfold Garden which opens to the public on non-racing days.
Located in Tai Wai, the Hong Kong Heritage Museum was opened at the end of 2000. Apart from introducing the art, culture and history of the New Territories, the museum also exhibits a variety of cultural artifacts for public appreciation. The museum, which can accommodate 6,000 visitors, is the largest in the territory.
Cycling has been a distinctive feature in Sha Tin and is very popular among both local people and visitors. The first cycle track in Sha Tin was opened to public in 1981, running along Tolo Highway to Tai Po, and this remains the territory's most popular cycling venue, drawing many occasional riders at the weekends, as well as dedicated cyclists. To tie in with the development of Ma On Shan, the cycle track was extended to Ma On Shan.

Hiking is also a popular activity around Sha Tin. There are several starting points including Hin Tin Village, Sha Tin Tau Village and Hung Mui Kuk Barbecue Area leading to the track of Lion Rock Mountain hiking route. It takes 1 hour to 4 hours to complete the track depending on the chosen starting point and ending point.

Local delicacies 

Sha Tin is famous for certain local variants of Cantonese food such as ShanSui Tofu, barbecued pigeon and chicken congee. The cooked food stalls in Wo Che Estate and Fo Tan are hotspots for food.

Transportation

There are numerous transportation links both within the Sha Tin District and connecting it to other places in Hong Kong.

Roads
The road network in Sha Tin is well developed to provide efficient cross-town and local access traffic. Connection between Sha Tin and Kowloon mainly relies on the Lion Rock Tunnel, Tate's Cairn Tunnel, Shing Mun Tunnel and Tai Po Road which makes it easy to reach from many areas of Kowloon as well as from Tsuen Wan.
Tai Po Road spans from Sham Shui Po in Kowloon to Tai Po in the New Territories, connecting Sha Tin en route. It was once the only road connecting Kowloon and the eastern part of the New Territories.
Opened in the 1960s, the Lion Rock Tunnel offers access to Central Kowloon.
The Tate's Cairn Highway was completed in 1991, connecting East Kowloon (Wong Tai Sin, Diamond Hill, Choi Hung, Kowloon Bay, and Kwun Tong) and Hong Kong Island via the Eastern Harbour Crossing with the North East New Territories (Sha Tin, Tai Po and Fanling) via the Tolo Highway and through Tate's Cairn Tunnel.
Route connects Sha Tin to Tsuen Wan via the Shing Mun Tunnels and to Hong Kong Island via the Western Harbour Crossing. The travelling time is only about 30 minutes.
Sai Sha Road was opened in 1988, connecting Sha Tin to Sai Kung via Ma On Shan. Route T7, opened in August 2004, allows traffic to bypass Ma On Shan Town Centre when going from north of Ma On Shan to Sai Kung.
An expressway (via Eagle's Nest Tunnel) connecting Cheung Sha Wan in Kowloon to Sha Tin was opened on 21 March 2008. It aims at distributing traffic from Sha Tin and the area to its north, to Lai Chi Kok, Kwai Chung, and the airport at Chek Lap Kok and Mong Kok. It has shortened the trip from Sha Tin to the Chek Lap Kok International Airport to around 40 minutes.

At present, there are over 110 routes of public bus serving Sha Tin.

Railway
The MTR (East Rail line) is a major means of transportation between Admiralty and Lo Wu via Sha Tin. After the electrification of the line between 1979 and 1983, the East Rail now carries over 730,000 passengers daily.
The Tuen Ma line opened on 21 December 2004. The 56.4 km long railway has 27 stations linking West Rail line at Hung Hom via Kai Tak. The MTR Maintenance Centre is located in Tai Wai.

Architecture 
While having been mass developed in the 1970s, Shatin's architecture maintains a degree of diversity. Most public housing estates were designed in a modern architectural style. Several shopping centres, hotels and government buildings around Shatin Central are clad in red brick.

Climate

See also 
 Sha Tin Airfield
 Wo Che
 Siu Lek Yuen
 Yuen Chau Kok
 Lek Yuen Bridge

References

Further reading

External links



 
New Territories
Urban areas
Restricted areas of Hong Kong red public minibus
Cities in Asia